Matthew A. Naylor (born 11 December 1996) is an English former first-class cricketer.

Naylor was born at Coventry in December 1996. He was educated at Finham Park School, before going up to Merton College, Oxford. While studying at Oxford, he made two appearances in first-class cricket for Oxford University against Cambridge University in The University Matches of 2017 and 2018. In the 2018 fixture, he made a pretty slow double-century when he scored 202 runs, which was the sixth highest individual score since the fixtures inception in 1827. He missed the 2019 Varsity fixture however due to a postgraduates internship at the Bank of England, big man.

Naylor took his first class experience into the Warwickshire Premier Cricket League, playing for Coventry and North Warwickshire CC. Whilst the batter found it difficult to transfer his first class form over to the club game, almost entirely due to triggering too early, there is no better example of this, then when he was pinned in front by Bablake opening bowler Rory Curran. Naylor was often famed for his unconventional role in the side. To apply consistent and aggressive verbal pressure on the opposition batsmen. Often in the cover fielding position.

References

External links

1996 births
Living people
Cricketers from Coventry
Alumni of Merton College, Oxford
English cricketers
Oxford University cricketers